Only That Real is a song by American rapper Iamsu! from his debut studio album, Sincerely Yours (2014). The song was released as his commercial debut single on February 4, 2014. It features guest verses by American rapper 2 Chainz and fellow HBK Gang member Sage the Gemini with production handled by P-Lo of The Invasion.

Release
The song premiered on January 28, 2014, and was released for digital download on iTunes Store on February 4, 2014. "Only That Real" is the first single of Iamsu!'s debut studio album, Sincerely Yours, which was released in May 2014.

Music video
The music video for "Only That Real", directed by Alex Nazari, premiered via BET Jams on April 11, 2014.

Remix
The official remix of the song, which features American rappers Yo Gotti and French Montana, was released on November 13, 2014.

Chart performance

References

External links
 

2014 singles
2014 songs
Iamsu! songs
2 Chainz songs
Sage the Gemini songs